Niculae-Cornel Crăciun (born 29 July 1925) is a Romanian Nordic skier who competed in the 1950s. At the 1952 Winter Olympics, he finished 19th in the Nordic combined event and 68th in the 18 km cross-country skiing event. At the 1948 Winter Olympics he participated in the demonstration sport military patrol and finished seventh as a member of the Romanian team. He was born in Crucea de Sus, Suceava County.

He is the brother of fellow Olympian Moise Crăciun.

External links
Olympic cross country skiing 18 km results: 1948-52
Olympic nordic combined results: 1948-64
 

1925 births
Possibly living people
Romanian male biathletes
Romanian male cross-country skiers
Romanian male Nordic combined skiers
Olympic biathletes of Romania
Romanian military patrol (sport) runners
Olympic cross-country skiers of Romania
Olympic Nordic combined skiers of Romania
Military patrol competitors at the 1948 Winter Olympics
Cross-country skiers at the 1952 Winter Olympics
Nordic combined skiers at the 1952 Winter Olympics
People from Suceava County